Etlingera megalocheilos is a monocotyledonous plant species that was first described by William Griffith, and got its current name from Axel Dalberg Poulsen. Etlingera megalocheilos is part of the genus Etlingera and the family Zingiberaceae. No subspecies are listed in the Catalog of Life.

References 

megalocheilos